The Paratech P Bi4 is a Swiss two-place paraglider that was designed by Uwe Bernholz and produced by Paratech of Appenzell. It is now out of production.

Design and development
The P Bi4 was designed as a tandem glider for flight training and as such was referred to as the Bi4, indicating "bi-place" or two seater.

The glider is DHV 1-2Bipl certified.

The wing design includes "Permanent Air Flow", a feature by which the cell openings are made smaller to improve the leading edge profile.

Specifications (P Bi4)

References

P Bi4
Paragliders